Lukas Hoffmann may refer to:
 Lukas Hoffmann (canoeist) (born 1984), German canoeist
 Lukas Hoffmann (footballer) (born 1997), German footballer

See also 
 Luc Hoffmann (1923–2016), Swiss ornithologist, conservationist, and philanthropist